John Bayard Taylor Campbell III (born July 19, 1955) is an American politician who served as a U.S. representative from California from 2005 to 2015. A member of the Republican Party, he previously served in the California State Assembly (2000–2004) and California State Senate (2004–2005). In Congress, Campbell represented the state's 48th congressional district for four terms and 45th congressional district for one term. On June 27, 2013, he announced that he would not seek reelection in 2014.

Business career

In 1985, Campbell became President and CEO of Campbell Automotive Group. In 1990, he became President and CEO of Saturn of Orange County. Campbell became Chairman and CEO of Saab of Orange County in 1999.

California Legislature
Elected to represent southern Orange County's 70th District in the California State Assembly in 2000, Campbell won 60% of the vote in a five-way race to replace term-limited Assemblywoman Marilyn Brewer. Campbell was reelected in 2002 with 67% of the vote.

In the 2004 race to replace the term-limited Ross Johnson in the 35th State Senate District, Campbell won the Republican primary with 61% of the vote against fellow Assemblyman Ken Maddox, who received 30% of the vote. In the general election, Campbell won with 64%. Then-Governor Arnold Schwarzenegger, a close ally of Campbell, endorsed him in the race.

As a state Senator, Campbell served as Vice Chair of both the Business Professions and Economic Development Committee and the Labor and Industrial Relations Committee. He was also a member of the Budget and Fiscal Review Committee; the Energy, Utilities, and Communications Committee; the Environmental Quality Committee; and the Government Modernization, Efficiency, and Accountability Committee.

U.S. House of Representatives

Committee assignments
 Committee on the Budget
 Committee on Financial Services
 Chairman, Subcommittee on Monetary Policy and Trade
 Subcommittee on Financial Institutions and Consumer Credit
 Joint Economic Committee

Party leadership and caucus membership
 Former Chairman of the Budget and Spending Task Force of the Republican Study Committee

On June 17, 2009, Campbell signed on as a co-sponsor of H.R. 1503, the bill introduced as a reaction to conspiracy theories which claimed that U.S. President Barack Obama is not a natural born U.S. citizen. Campbell stated on Hardball with Chris Matthews that he believed that Obama was a natural born U.S. citizen and that he believed the bill would end the conspiracy theories surrounding Obama's citizenship.

On July 13, 2006, Campbell was one of 33 Republican House members to vote against renewing the Voting Rights Act for 25 years, mostly out of his objections to the bilingual ballots that the VRA mandated, which he and his fellow Republicans called an "unfunded mandate".

On December 15, 2010, Campbell was one of fifteen Republican House members to vote in favor of repealing the United States military's "Don't Ask, Don't Tell" ban on openly gay service members.

In 2011, Campbell voted against the National Defense Authorization Act for Fiscal Year 2012 as part of a controversial provision that allows the government and the military to indefinitely detain American citizens and others without trial.

He sponsored the Put Your Money Where Your Mouth Is Act which would make it easier for taxpayers to make donations to the federal government. In 2010 Campbell signed a pledge sponsored by Americans for Prosperity promising to vote against any Global Warming legislation that would raise taxes.

Campbell is a member of the Congressional Constitution Caucus.

Political campaigns

After Congressman Christopher Cox resigned to become Chairman of the U.S. Securities and Exchange Commission, Campbell became a candidate to replace Cox in the 48th Congressional District Special Election, scheduled for October 4, 2005. Campbell received endorsements from most of the important Republican officials in the state but faced some criticism as his stance on illegal immigration was seen as being too lenient. He faced a strong third-party challenge from American Independent Party candidate Jim Gilchrist. On October 4, Campbell garnered 46% of the vote, below the 50% needed to avoid a runoff. He faced Democrat Steve Young, American Independent Jim Gilchrist, Libertarian Bruce D. Cohen and Green Bea Tirtilli in the December 6 runoff, which he won with 44% of the vote. Campbell was sworn in on December 7.

Campbell was re-elected to his first full term in 2006 with 60% of the vote. In 2008 and 2010, he was re-elected with 56% and 60%, respectively, of the vote. In 2012, he was re-elected with 59% of the vote.

In 2009, several watchdog groups claimed Campbell took $170,000 in campaign contributions from car dealers, and then introduced legislation exempting them from consumer protection laws.

References

External links
 
 
 Blog archive at Townhall.com
 Join California John Campbell
 
 Look Through The Chaos (Personal blog)

|-

|-

|-

|-

1955 births
Living people
American Presbyterians
American automobile salespeople
American retail chief executives
Republican Party California state senators
Republican Party members of the California State Assembly
People from Greater Los Angeles
People from Irvine, California
People from Lake Forest, California
Republican Party members of the United States House of Representatives from California
University of California, Los Angeles alumni
Marshall School of Business alumni
20th-century American businesspeople
21st-century American politicians
Ernst & Young people